Brock Ralph (born 7 July 1980) is a former professional Canadian football slotback and wide receiver.

Early years 
Ralph was born to Jim and Shelly Ralph in Raymond, Alberta, and attended Raymond High School, where his junior and senior football teams won consecutive provincial titles with a 25–1 record and Ralph was named the league's Most Valuable Player. He is the older brother to retired Calgary Stampeders slotback Brett Ralph. In addition to football, he played basketball and was the provincial champion in the 100 metres and triple jump. In addition to Basketball, Ralph also played Baseball and was drafted in the 15th round by the Baltimore Orioles in the 1999 Major League Baseball draft.

References

Further reading

External links 
 Hamilton Tiger-Cats bio

1980 births
Living people
Edmonton Elks players
Hamilton Tiger-Cats players
People from Raymond, Alberta
Players of Canadian football from Alberta
Winnipeg Blue Bombers players
Wyoming Cowboys football players